Vera Voronina (c.1904 – 1942?) was a Russian actress. She was born in Odessa, then part of the Russian Empire, but her family fled after the Russian Revolution of 1917. She starred in films in several countries including Germany, Britain, Sweden and the United States. The information  about her life is very scarce and even her death year is disputed. She arrived in the USA in January 1927 and stayed for about two years. Her name was given as Wera Awramow aged 22 born in Odessa and she was traveling with her husband Nikolaus Awramow a lawyer born in Kyiv aged 34.

Selected filmography
 Sons in Law (1926)
 She Is the Only One (1926)
 The Heart of a German Mother (1926)
 Huntingtower (1927)
 The Whirlwind of Youth (1927)
 Time to Love (1927)
 The Patriot (1928)
 Tales from the Vienna Woods (1928)
 Inherited Passions (1929)
 Call of the Blood (1929)

References

External links
 

1900s births
Russian film actresses
Russian silent film actresses
20th-century Russian actresses
Actors from Odesa
Year of death missing
People who emigrated to escape Bolshevism
Emigrants from the Russian Empire to Germany
Emigrants from the Russian Empire to the United Kingdom
Emigrants from the Russian Empire to the United States